A train derailment took place in the village of Buyofwe, Lualaba Province, Democratic Republic of the Congo, on 11 March 2022. It killed 75 people and injured 125 others.

Accident
On 11 March 2022, a freight train operated by the Société nationale des chemins de fer du Congo left the town of Kitenta heading towards the village of Buyofwe. The train was carrying several hundred stowaways and had 10-15 cars. At 11:50 pm local time, while traveling uphill near the village of Buyofwe, the train derailed. The derailment sent seven of the cars on the train tumbling down into a ravine, killing 75 people and injuring another 125.

References

2022 disasters in the Democratic Republic of the Congo
2022 in the Democratic Republic of the Congo
Derailments in the Democratic Republic of the Congo
2022 train accident
Railway accidents in 2022
March 2022 events in Africa